The Jerusalem War Cemetery is a British cemetery in Jerusalem for fallen servicemen of the British Commonwealth in the World War I in the Palestine campaign.

The main cemetery is located on Mount Scopus next to the Hadassah hospital and the Hebrew University of Jerusalem campus, 4.5 km north of the Old City of Jerusalem.

The cemetery contains the graves of 2,515 Commonwealth service personnel (including 100 unidentified), a number of whom were removed from at least seven other cemeteries in the area where they could not be maintained. A small Jewish section is near Plot 'N'. Units from Australia, New Zealand, India, Egypt, South Africa and the British West Indies are also represented besides those of the United Kingdom. A small number of German and Turkish dead also are buried at the cemetery.

Notable burials include Major Philip Glazebrook, British Conservative member of parliament.

The cemetery also contains the Jerusalem Memorial to 3,300 Commonwealth service personnel who died on operations in the same war in Egypt and Palestine and have no known grave. Its architect was John James Burnet and the sculptor Gilbert Bayes. It was unveiled on 7 May 1927 by Lord Allenby, who had been British commander-in-chief in the Middle East. The memorial incorporates a chapel with a mosaic that was designed by Robert Anning Bell.

Notable commemoratees include New Zealand rugby union international, Trooper Eric Harper.

Other related cemeteries in Jerusalem
The Indian War Cemetery is another UK World War I cemetery in Jerusalem, located in the southern neighbourhood of Talpiot, on Korei HaDorot Street. It contains the mass grave of 79 Indian soldiers from the Egyptian Expeditionary Force, as well as the graves of 290 Turkish prisoners of war. Other war dead, many of them Arab workers employed by the expeditionary corps, are buried in three more separate cemeteries: the Latin (Catholic) Cemetery and the Protestant Cemetery (likely those from Mount Zion), and the Bab Sitna Mariam Muslim cemetery next to the Lions' Gate.

Photographs

References

External links
 
 
 

Mount Scopus
Cemeteries in Jerusalem
Commonwealth War Graves Commission cemeteries in Israel
World War I cemeteries